Pergine Valsugana (Pèrzen or Pèrzem in local dialect) is a comune (municipality) in Trentino in the northern Italian region Trentino-Alto Adige/Südtirol, located about  east of Trento.  

Pergine Valsugana borders the following municipalities: Baselga di Pinè, Trento, Fornace, Sant'Orsola Terme, Civezzano, Frassilongo, Vignola-Falesina, Novaledo, Levico Terme, Tenna, Vigolo Vattaro, Bosentino, Caldonazzo and Calceranica al Lago.

Main sights
Castle, a medieval fortification on a hill at 657 m above the sea level. It is known from 845, although it could be of Lombard or even late-Roman origins. 
Late Gothic-style church  of Santa Maria
Church of San Carlo, rebuilt in 1619
Palazzo Tomelin (17th century)
Palazzo a Prato (16th century)
Palazzo Gentili-Crivelli (16th century)
Palazzo Hippoliti (late 15th century)

References

External links

 Official website 
San Cristoforo al Lago, "frazione" in Pergine Valsugana  

Cities and towns in Trentino-Alto Adige/Südtirol